Julia Chinyere Oparah, formerly Julia Sudbury, is a professor and department chair of Ethnic Studies at Mills College in Oakland California, where she also played a major role in establishing its  Queer Studies Program. She is an activist-scholar, a community organizer, and an intellectual focused on producing relevant scholarship in accompaniment to social justice movements.

Education 
Oparah graduated with her bachelor's degree with honors from the University of Cambridge Clare College in 1989 and studied modern and medieval languages and literature—Spanish and German. Later she received a diploma with distinction in community practice from Luton University in 1991. She continued her studies and received two master's degrees, one from the University of Cambridge Clare college in Modern and Medieval Languages-Spanish and Germanic 1993, and another with distinction from the University of Warwick from the Centre for Race Relations in Race and Ethnic Studies in 1994, and she completed her studies at Warwick in 1997 with her PhD in sociology.

Teaching career 
Her teaching career began in the spring of 1997 at UC Berkeley, followed by Mills College that same year as a visiting assisting professor in the Department of Ethnic Studies. She also lectured in the Department of Women's Studies at UC Berkeley in the spring of 1998, and the department of Community Studies at UC Santa Cruz. In the fall of 1999 she was a visiting professor at the University of Toronto in Canada in the Institute for Women's and Gender Studies. Meanwhile, she was also assistant professor at Mills College from the fall of 1998–2001 in the Department of Ethnic Studies, where she later became associate professor in the Department of Ethnic Studies from 2001 to 2006. Meanwhile, Oparah was also Canada Research Chair in Social Justice, Equity and Diversity, and the Department of Social Work at the University of Toronto from 2004 to 2006. Where she also received the Rockefeller Fellowship in Sex, Race and Globalization in 2002. From 2006 to the present, Oparah has been a professor in the department of Ethnic Studies at Mills College, where she has also been the chair of the department since 2008.

Currently, Oparah is provost dean of the faculty, and professor of ethnic studies at Mills college, where she has been teaching since 1997. Prior to this, she was the associate provost at Mills. She has also played a leading role in the establishment of Mills' Public Health and Health Equity program, as well as serving as chair of the Colleges Gender Expression and Identity Initiative. She also established the Retention, and Academic Success and Advising Committee.

Aside from her role as a professor and provost dean of the faculty, Oparah also oversees the Art Museum, the Olin Library, Mills College Children School, Office of Institutional Research and the Office of Learning, Advising and Balance. She has also chaired the colleges Gender Expression and Identity Initiative, which has led to the development of a report on improving the experiences of gender fluid and transgender students at Mills.

Mills Provostship, Layoffs, and Vote of No Confidence 

Oparah became the Provost and Dean of Faculty at Mills College in January 2017.  Due to Mills' financial crisis, Oparah eventually oversaw layoffs of tenured faculty, including those in Philosophy, English, and Ethnic Studies.  Oparah's Provostship ended with a vote of "no confidence" on the part of Mills College faculty after she, along with Mills' president, Elizabeth Hillman, moved to close the historic college, which is known for serving women of color. The no confidence measure passed with 73 percent approval by faculty members.

University of San Francisco Provostship 

While overseeing layoffs and closure at Mills, Oparah accepted a position as Provost of the University of San Francisco, where she replaced Donald Heller, who himself had resigned after receiving a vote of no confidence from USF's faculty.  Oparah is the first Black woman to hold the role of Provost at USF.

Bibliography 
 Other Kinds of Dreams: Black Women's Organizations and the Politics of Transformation. (1998, London and New York: Routledge)
 Global Lockdown: Race, Gender and the Prison-Industrial Complex. (2005, New York: Routledge)
 Color of Violence: The Incite! Anthology, (2006, Cambridge, MA: South End Press)
 Outsiders Within: Writing on Transracial Adoption. (2006, Cambridge, MA: South End Press, with Jane Jeong Trenka and Sun Yung Shin, eds)
 Activist Scholarship: Antiracism, Feminism and Social Change (2009, Boulder, CO: Paradigm Publishers, with Margo Okazawa-Rey, eds)
 Birthing Justice: Black Women, Pregnancy and Childbirth, (2015, New York: Routledge, with Alicia D. Bonaparte, eds.)
 Birthing Justice Discussion Guide (2015, New York: Routledge, with Julia Chinyere Oparah and Olivia Polk)

Awards and honors 
 Black Women and the Racial Politics of Childbirth, Quigley Summer Research Award 2011.
 Sarlo Award, 2009-2010
 Eugene E. Trefethen Chair, 2008-2009
 Mary S. Metz Professorship for excellence in teaching, 2007-2008
 Canada Research Chair in Social Justice, Equity and Diversity, University of Toronto, 2004-2006
 Academic Initiative Fund, Centre for Aboriginal Initiatives, University of Toronto, 2005
 Association of American University Women Postdoctoral Fellowship, 2002-2003
 Rockefeller Humanities Residency Fellowship, University of Arizona, Tucson, 2002-2003
 Gaea Foundation Summer Residency, 2002
 Meg Quigley Award, Women's Studies Program, Mills College, Summer 2002, 1999, 1998

References

  No-Confidence Vote at Mills Amid Closure Plans  https://www.insidehighered.com/quicktakes/2021/05/06/no-confidence-vote-mills-amid-closure-plans
  News and Notes: A Bulletin of the AAUP, Mills College Chapter  http://ucbfa.org/wp-content/uploads/2017/07/Mills_AAUP_7_23_Newsletter.pdf
 ' ' Oparah Shares about Her Background, Defends Actions at Mills ' ' http://sffoghorn.com/oparah-shares-about-her-background-defends-actions-at-mills/

Living people
Alumni of Clare College, Cambridge
Alumni of the University of Warwick
British women activists
Mills College faculty
Year of birth missing (living people)